This is a list of central banks and currencies of Europe .

European Central Bank

Non-Eurozone currencies

See also
Currency
Economy of Europe
List of banks in Europe
List of currencies in Europe
List of European stock exchanges

 
Economy of Europe
Currencies of Europe